A referendum on the policies of Ion Antonescu was held in Romania on 15 November 1941. The referendum, the second that year on Antonescu's policies, were held after the extension of working hours on 2 October had been met with riots. The vote was carried out orally, with a silence taken as a "yes" vote, and was approved with 99.99% in favour and only 68 people voting against.

Results

References

Romania
1941 in Romania
Referendums in Romania
November 1941 events